Adversarial machine learning is the study of the attacks on machine learning algorithms, and of the defenses against such attacks. A survey from May 2020 exposes the fact that practitioners report a dire need for better protecting machine learning systems in industrial applications.

To understand, note that most machine learning techniques are mostly designed to work on specific problem sets, under the assumption that the training and test data are generated from the same statistical distribution (IID). However, this assumption is often dangerously violated in practical high-stake applications, where users may intentionally supply fabricated data that violates the statistical assumption.

Some of the most common threat models in adversarial machine learning include evasion attacks, data poisoning attacks, Byzantine attacks and model extraction.

History 
In 2004, Nilesh Dalvi and others noted that linear classifiers used in spam filters could be defeated by simple "evasion attacks" as spammers inserted "good words" into their spam emails. (Around 2007, some spammers added random noise to fuzz words within "image spam" in order to defeat OCR-based filters.) In 2006, Marco Barreno and others published "Can Machine Learning Be Secure?", outlining a broad taxonomy of attacks. As late as 2013 many researchers continued to hope that non-linear classifiers (such as support vector machines and neural networks) might be robust to adversaries, until Battista Biggio and others demonstrated the first gradient-based attacks on such machine-learning models (2012-2013). In 2012, deep neural networks began to dominate computer vision problems; starting in 2014, Christian Szegedy and others demonstrated that deep neural networks could be fooled by adversaries, again using a gradient-based attack to craft adversarial perturbations.

Recently, it was observed that adversarial attacks are harder to produce in the practical world due to the different environmental constraints that cancel out the effect of noises. For example, any small rotation or slight illumination on an adversarial image can destroy the adversariality. In addition, researchers such as Google Brain's Nicholas Frosst point out that it is much easier to make self-driving cars miss stop signs by physically removing the sign itself, rather than creating adversarial examples. Frosst also believes that the adversarial machine learning community incorrectly assumes models trained on a certain data distribution will also perform well on a completely different data distribution. He suggests that a new approach to machine learning should be explored, and is currently working on a unique neural network that has characteristics more similar to human perception than state of the art approaches.

While adversarial machine learning continues to be heavily rooted in academia, large tech companies such as Google, Microsoft, and IBM have begun curating documentation and open source code bases to allow others to concretely assess the robustness of machine learning models and minimize the risk of adversarial attacks.

Examples 
Examples include attacks in spam filtering, where spam messages are obfuscated through the misspelling of "bad" words or the insertion of "good" words; attacks in computer security, such as obfuscating malware code within network packets or modifying the characteristics of a network flow to mislead intrusion detection; attacks in biometric recognition where fake biometric traits may be exploited to impersonate a legitimate user; or to compromise users' template galleries that adapt to updated traits over time.

Researchers showed that by changing only one-pixel it was possible to fool deep learning algorithms. Others 3-D printed a toy turtle with a texture engineered to make Google's object detection AI classify it as a rifle regardless of the angle from which the turtle was viewed. Creating the turtle required only low-cost commercially available 3-D printing technology.

A machine-tweaked image of a dog was shown to look like a cat to both computers and humans. A 2019 study reported that humans can guess how machines will classify adversarial images. Researchers discovered methods for perturbing the appearance of a stop sign such that an autonomous vehicle classified it as a merge or speed limit sign.

McAfee attacked Tesla's former Mobileye system, fooling it into driving 50 mph over the speed limit, simply by adding a two-inch strip of black tape to a speed limit sign.

Adversarial patterns on glasses or clothing designed to deceive facial-recognition systems or license-plate readers, have led to a niche industry of "stealth streetwear".

An adversarial attack on a neural network can allow an attacker to inject algorithms into the target system. Researchers can also create adversarial audio inputs to disguise commands to intelligent assistants in benign-seeming audio; a parallel literature explores human perception of such stimuli.

Clustering algorithms are used in security applications. Malware and computer virus analysis aims to identify malware families, and to generate specific detection signatures.

Attack modalities

Taxonomy
Attacks against (supervised) machine learning algorithms have been categorized along three primary axes: influence on the classifier, the security violation and their specificity.

 Classifier influence: An attack can influence the classifier by disrupting the classification phase. This may be preceded by an exploration phase to identify vulnerabilities. The attacker's capabilities might be restricted by the presence of data manipulation constraints.
 Security violation: An attack can supply malicious data that gets classified as legitimate. Malicious data supplied during training can cause legitimate data to be rejected after training.
 Specificity: A targeted attack attempts to allow a specific intrusion/disruption. Alternatively, an indiscriminate attack creates general mayhem.

This taxonomy has been extended into a more comprehensive threat model that allows explicit assumptions about the adversary's goal, knowledge of the attacked system, capability of manipulating the input data/system components, and on attack strategy. This taxonomy has further been extended to include dimensions for defense strategies against adversarial attacks.

Strategies 
Below are some of the most commonly encountered attack scenarios:

Data poisoning 
Poisoning consists of contaminating the training dataset. Given that learning algorithms are shaped by their training datasets, poisoning can effectively reprogram algorithms. Serious concerns have been raised especially for user-generated training data, e.g. for content recommendation or natural language models, especially given the ubiquity of fake accounts. To measure the scale of the risk, it suffices to note that Facebook reportedly removes around 7 billion fake accounts per year. In fact, data poisoning has been reported as the leading concern for industrial applications.

On social medias, disinformation campaigns are known to produce vast amounts of fabricated activities to bias recommendation and moderation algorithms, to push certain content over others.

A particular case of data poisoning is called backdoor attack, which aims to teach a specific behavior for inputs with a given trigger, e.g. a small defect on images, sounds, videos or texts.

For instance, intrusion detection systems (IDSs) are often re-trained using collected data. An attacker may poison this data by injecting malicious samples during operation that subsequently disrupt retraining.

Byzantine attacks 
As machine learning is scaled, it often relies on multiple computing machines. In federated learning, for instance, edge devices collaborate with a central server, typically by sending gradients or model parameters. However, some of these devices may deviate from their expected behavior, e.g. to harm the central server's model or to bias algorithms towards certain behaviors (e.g., amplifying the recommendation of disinformation content). On the other hand, if the training is performed on a single machine, then the model is very vulnerable to a failure of the machine, or an attack on the machine; the machine is a single point of failure. In fact, the machine owner may themselves insert provably undetectable backdoors.

The current leading solutions to make (distributed) learning algorithms provably resilient to a minority of malicious (a.k.a. Byzantine) participants are based on robust gradient aggregation rules. Nevertheless, in the context of heterogeneous honest participants, such as users with different consumption habits for recommendation algorithms or writing styles for language models, there are provable impossibility theorems on what any robust learning algorithm can guarantee.

Evasion 
Evasion attacks consist of exploiting the imperfection of a trained model. For instance, spammers and hackers often attempt to evade detection by obfuscating the content of spam emails and malware. Samples are modified to evade detection; that is, to be classified as legitimate. This does not involve influence over the training data. A clear example of evasion is image-based spam in which the spam content is embedded within an attached image to evade textual analysis by anti-spam filters. Another example of evasion is given by spoofing attacks against biometric verification systems.

Evasion attacks can be generally split into two different categories: black box attacks and white box attacks.

Model extraction
Model extraction involves an adversary probing a black box machine learning system in order to extract the data it was trained on.  This can cause issues when either the training data or the model itself is sensitive and confidential. For example, model extraction could be used to extract a proprietary stock trading model which the adversary could then use for their own financial benefit.

In the extreme case, model extraction can lead to model stealing, which corresponds to extracting a sufficient amount of data from the model to enable the complete reconstruction of the model.

On the other hand, membership inference is a targeted model extraction attack, which infers the owner of a data point, often by leveraging the overfitting resulting from poor machine learning practices. Concerningly, this is sometimes achievable even without knowledge or access to a target model's parameters, raising security concerns for models trained on sensitive data, including but not limited to medical records and/or personally identifiable information. With the emergence of transfer learning and public accessibility of many state of the art machine learning models, tech companies are increasingly drawn to create models based on public ones, giving attackers freely accessible information to the structure and type of model being used.

Categories

Adversarial deep reinforcement learning 
Adversarial deep reinforcement learning is an active area of research in reinforcement learning focusing on vulnerabilities of learned policies. In this research area some studies initially showed that reinforcement learning policies are susceptible to imperceptible adversarial manipulations. While some methods have been proposed to overcome these susceptibilities, in the most recent studies it has been shown that these proposed solutions are far from providing an accurate representation of current vulnerabilities of deep reinforcement learning policies.

Adversarial Natural Language Processing 
Adversarial attacks on speech recognition have been introduced for speech-to-text applications, in particular for Mozilla's implementation of DeepSpeech.

Specific attack types 
There are a large variety of different adversarial attacks that can be used against machine learning systems. Many of these work on both deep learning systems as well as traditional machine learning models such as SVMs and  linear regression. A high level sample of these attack types include:

 Adversarial Examples
 Trojan Attacks / Backdoor Attacks
 Model Inversion
 Membership Inference

Adversarial examples 
An adversarial example refers to specially crafted input which is designed to look "normal" to humans but causes misclassification to a machine learning model.  Often, a form of specially designed "noise"  is used to elicit the misclassifications. Below are some current techniques for generating adversarial examples in the literature (by no means an exhaustive list).

 Gradient-based evasion attack
 Fast Gradient Sign Method (FGSM)
 Projected Gradient Descent (PGD)
 Carlini and Wagner (C&W) attack
 Adversarial patch attack

Black Box Attacks 
Black box attacks in adversarial machine learning assumes that the adversary can only get outputs for provided inputs and has no knowledge of the model structure or parameters. In this case, the adversarial example is generated either using a model created from scratch, or without any model at all (excluding the ability to query the original model). In either case, the objective of these attacks are to create adversarial examples that are able to transfer to the black box model in question.

Square Attack 
The Square Attack was introduced in 2020 as a black box evasion adversarial attack based on querying classification scores without the need of gradient information. As a score based black box attack, this adversarial approach is able to query probability distributions across model output classes, but has no other access to the model itself. According to the paper's authors, the proposed Square Attack required less queries than when compared to state of the art score based black box attacks at the time.

The goal of this attack is as follows:

The result in theory is an adversarial example that is highly confident in the incorrect class but is also very similar to the original image. To find such example, Square Attack utilizes the iterative random search technique to randomly perturb the image in hopes of improving the objective function. In each step, the algorithm perturbs only a small square section of pixels, hence the name Square Attack, which terminates as soon as an adversarial example is found in order to improve query efficiency. Finally, since the attack algorithm uses scores and not gradient information, the authors of the paper indicate that this approach is not affected by gradient masking, a common technique formerly used to prevent evasion attacks.

HopSkipJump Attack 
This black box attack was also proposed as a query efficient attack, but one that relies solely on access to any input's predicted output class. In other words, the HopSkipJump attack does not require the ability to calculate gradients or access to score values like the Square Attack, and will require just the model's class prediction output (for any given input). The proposed attack is split into two different settings, targeted and untargeted, but both are built from the general idea of adding minimal perturbations that leads to a different model output. In the targeted setting, the goal is to cause the model to misclassify the perturbed image to a specific target label (that is not the original label). In the untargeted setting, the goal is to cause the model to misclassify the perturbed image to any label that is not the original label.

To solve this problem, the attack proposes the following boundary function  for both the untargeted and targeted setting:

This can be further simplified to better visualize the boundary between different potential adversarial examples:

With this boundary function, the attack then follows an iterative algorithm to find adversarial examples  for a given image  that satisfies the attack objectives.

 Initialize  to some point where 
 Iterate below
 Boundary search
 Gradient update
 Compute the gradient
 Find the step size

HopSkipJump authors prove that this iterative algorithm will converge, leading  to a point right along the boundary that is very close in distance to the original image.

However, since HopSkipJump is a proposed black box attack and the iterative algorithm above requires the calculation of a gradient in the second iterative step (which black box attacks do not have access to), the authors propose a solution to gradient calculation that requires only the model's output predictions alone.

The result of the equation above gives a close approximation of the gradient required in step 2 of the iterative algorithm, completing HopSkipJump as a black box attack.

White Box Attacks 
White box attacks assumes that the adversary has access to model parameters on top of being able to get labels for provided inputs.

Fast Gradient Sign Method (FGSM) 
One of the very first proposed attacks for generating adversarial examples was proposed by Google researchers Ian J. Goodfellow, Jonathon Shlens, and Christian Szegedy. The attack was called fast gradient sign method, and it consists of adding a linear amount of in-perceivable noise to the image and causing a model to incorrectly classify it. This noise is calculated by multiplying the sign of the gradient with respect to the image we want to perturb by a small constant epsilon. As epsilon increases, the model is more likely to be fooled, but the perturbations become easier to identify as well.

One important property of this equation is that the gradient is calculated with respect to the input image since the goal is to generate an image that maximizes the loss for the original image of true label . In traditional gradient descent (for model training), the gradient is used to update the weights of the model since the goal is to minimize the loss for the model on a ground truth dateset. The Fast Gradient Sign Method was proposed as a fast way to generate adversarial examples to evade the model, based on the hypothesis that neural networks cannot resist even linear amounts of perturbation to the input.

Carlini & Wagner (C&W) 
In an effort to analyze existing adversarial attacks and defenses, researchers at the University of California, Berkeley, Nicholas Carlini and David Wagner in 2016 propose a faster and more robust method to generate adversarial examples.

The attack proposed by Carlini and Wagner begins with trying to solve a difficult non-linear optimization equation:

Here the objective is to minimize the noise, added to the original input , such that the machine learning algorithm predicts the original input with delta (or ) as some other class . However instead of directly the above equation, Carlini and Wagner propose using a new function  such that:

This condenses the first equation to the problem below:

and even more to the equation below:

Carlini and Wagner then propose the use of the below function in place of  using , a function that determines class probabilities for given input . When substituted in, this equation can be thought of as finding a target class that is more confident than the next likeliest class by some constant amount:

When solved using gradient descent, this equation is able to produce stronger adversarial examples when compared to fast gradient sign method that is also able to bypass defensive distillation, a defense that was once proposed to be effective against adversarial examples.

Defenses 

Researchers have proposed a multi-step approach to protecting machine learning.

 Threat modeling – Formalize the attackers goals and capabilities with respect to the target system.
 Attack simulation – Formalize the optimization problem the attacker tries to solve according to possible attack strategies.
 Attack impact evaluation
 Countermeasure design
 Noise detection (For evasion based attack)
 Information laundering – Alter the information received by adversaries (for model stealing attacks)

Mechanisms 
A number of defense mechanisms against evasion, poisoning, and privacy attacks have been proposed, including:

 Secure learning algorithms
 Byzantine-resilient algorithms
 Multiple classifier systems
 AI-written algorithms.
 AIs that explore the training environment; for example, in image recognition, actively navigating a 3D environment rather than passively scanning a fixed set of 2D images.
 Privacy-preserving learning
 Ladder algorithm for Kaggle-style competitions
 Game theoretic models
 Sanitizing training data
 Adversarial training
 Backdoor detection algorithms
 Gradient masking/obfuscation techniques: to prevent the adversary exploiting the gradient in white-box attacks. This family of defenses is deemed unreliable as these models are still vulnerable to black-box attacks or can be circumvented in other ways.
 Ensembles of models have been proposed in the literature but caution should be applied when relying on them: usually ensembling weak classifiers results in a more accurate model but it does not seem to apply in the adversarial context.

See also

 Pattern recognition
 Fawkes (image cloaking software)

References

External links 

 MITRE ATLAS: Adversarial Threat Landscape for Artificial-Intelligence Systems
 NIST 8269 Draft: A Taxonomy and Terminology of Adversarial Machine Learning
 NIPS 2007 Workshop on Machine Learning in Adversarial Environments for Computer Security
 AlfaSVMLib – Adversarial Label Flip Attacks against Support Vector Machines
 
 Dagstuhl Perspectives Workshop on "Machine Learning Methods for Computer Security"
 Workshop on Artificial Intelligence and Security, (AISec) Series

Machine learning
Computer security